June Caprice (born Helen Elizabeth Lawson, November 19, 1895 – November 9, 1936)  was an American silent film actress.

Early life and career

Born Helen Elizabeth Lawson in Arlington, Massachusetts, Caprice was educated in Boston.

She began her acting career in live theatre and in 1916 signed with the Fox Film Corporation. In 1916 William Fox searched to find a "second Mary Pickford." By the summer of that year he believed he had located the woman he predicted would be the best known female on the screen within six months time. The 1916 press release claimed both that she was a 17-year-old teenager, and in the same press release "just a little over 17 years of age." Her obituary in 1936 listed her age as 40, making her about 20 years of age at her discovery.

Caprice's screen debut came in Caprice of the Mountains (1916). A New York Times film critic said of her, "she is young, pretty, graceful, petite, with an eloquence of gesture that augurs a bright future in the movies." Adopting the stage name June Caprice, she made sixteen films for Fox, half of which were directed by Harry F. Millarde. The two began a personal relationship and eventually married.

Retirement
She left the film business to begin a family, giving birth to a daughter June Elizabeth Millarde in 1922. It is believed she returned to working on stage and modeling, appearing on 1920s Coca-Cola company calendars holding a fountain glass of Coke. In 1931 her husband died at the age of forty-six. Caprice died five years later from a heart attack in Los Angeles. She had been suffering from cancer. She was interred in the Forest Lawn Memorial Park Cemetery in Glendale, California.

Caprice's daughter was fourteen years old when orphaned and was raised by her grandparents on Long Island, New York. June Millarde became a cover girl known as Toni Seven. She was the heiress to an estimated $3,000,000 fortune.

Filmography

References

Bibliography

External links

June Caprice New York Public Library Digital Gallery photo
June Caprice at silentsaregolden

American film actresses
American silent film actresses
American stage actresses
Vaudeville performers
People from Arlington, Massachusetts
Actresses from Massachusetts
1895 births
1936 deaths
20th-century American actresses
Burials at Forest Lawn Memorial Park (Glendale)